Mobarak Hossain Bhuyan (born 12 December 1990) is a retired Bangladeshi professional footballer who last played as a midfielder for Sheikh Russel KC. He played for the Bangladesh national team from 2010 to 2013

Club career
Mobarak entered football thorugh the U-16 JFF Cup, when his team Narsingdi became the champions. He made a name for himself after his brilliant display of performances during the 2013 Super Cup for Mohammedan SC. He was rewarded with both the Best Emerging Player and Most Valuable Player of the tournament awards, as Mohammedan claimed their first Super Cup trophy.

International career
On 31 August 2013, Mobarak made his international debut for Bangladesh against India at the 2013 SAFF Championship. He made earned a total of 3 caps for his country, all of which came during the same tournament.

Personal life
Mobarak's father Abdul Gafur Bhuiyan passed away on 6 July 2018, from a long suffering illness. Nicknamed "Scooter Gafoor" due to his speed, Mobarak's father was also a famous footballer during the 70', and played for clubs such as  East Pakistan press, Abahani Krira Chakra, East End Club and Rahmatganj MFS.

Honours
Mohammedan SC
Super Cup = 2013

Individual
2013 − Super Cup Most Valuable Player Award.
2013 − Super Cup Best Emerging Player.

References

Living people
1990 births
Bangladeshi footballers
Bangladesh international footballers
Association football midfielders
Mohammedan SC (Dhaka) players
Sheikh Russel KC players